A crow (pronounced ) is a bird of the genus Corvus, or more broadly a synonym for all of Corvus. Crows are generally black in colour. The word "crow" is used as part of the common name of many species. The related term "raven" is not pinned scientifically to any certain trait, but is rather a general grouping for larger Corvus spp.

Species 
 Corvus albus – Pied crow (Central African coasts to southern Africa)
 Corvus bennetti – Little crow (Australia)
 Corvus brachyrhynchos – American crow (United States, southern Canada, northern Mexico) 
 Corvus capensis – Cape crow or Cape rook (Eastern and southern Africa)
 Corvus cornix – Hooded crow (Northern and Eastern Europe and Northern Africa and Middle East)
 Corvus corone – Carrion crow (Europe and eastern Asia)
Corvus culminatus – Indian jungle crow (South Asia)
 Corvus edithae – Somali crow or dwarf raven (Eastern Africa)
 Corvus enca – Slender-billed crow (Malaysia, Borneo, Indonesia)
 Corvus florensis – Flores crow (Flores Island)
 Corvus fuscicapillus – Brown-headed crow (New Guinea)
 Corvus hawaiiensis (formerly C. tropicus) – Hawaiian crow (Hawaii)
 Corvus imparatus – Tamaulipas crow (Gulf of Mexico coast)
 Corvus insularis – Bismarck crow (Bismarck Archipelago, Papua New Guinea)
 Corvus jamaicensis – Jamaican crow (Jamaica)
 Corvus kubaryi – Mariana crow or aga (Guam, Rota)
 Corvus leucognaphalus – White-necked crow (Haiti, Dominican Republic, Puerto Rico)
Corvus levaillantii – Eastern jungle crow (India, Burma)
 Corvus macrorhynchos – Large-billed crow (Eastern Asia)
 Corvus meeki – Bougainville crow or Solomon Islands crow (Papua New Guinea, Northern Solomon Islands)
 Corvus moneduloides – New Caledonian crow (New Caledonia, Loyalty Islands)
 Corvus nasicus – Cuban crow (Cuba, Isla de la Juventud, Grand Caicos Island)
 Corvus orru – Torresian crow or Australian crow (Australia, New Guinea and nearby islands)
 Corvus ossifragus – Fish crow (Southeastern U.S. coast)
 Corvus palmarum – Palm crow (Cuba, Haiti, Dominican Republic)
 Corvus sinaloae – Sinaloa crow (Pacific coast from Sonora to Colima)
 Corvus splendens – House crow or Indian house crow (South Asia, Middle East, east Africa)
 Corvus torquatus – Collared crow (Eastern China, south into Vietnam)
 Corvus tristis – Grey crow or Bare-faced crow (New Guinea and neighboring islands)
 Corvus typicus – Piping crow or Celebes pied crow (Sulawesi, Muna, Butung)
 Corvus unicolor – Banggai crow (Banggai Island)
 Corvus validus – Long-billed crow (Northern Moluccas)
 Corvus violaceus – Violet crow (Seram) – recent split from slender-billed crow
 Corvus woodfordi – White-billed crow or Solomon Islands crow (Solomon Islands)

See also
 Jackdaw
 Raven
 Rook

Further reading
 

 
Bird common names